LeRoy T. Walker (June 14, 1918 – April 23, 2012) was an American track and field coach and the first black president of the United States Olympic Committee. In the 1996 Olympics, Walker was delegated to lead a 10,000 member group of the most talented athletes in the world. His goal was to make sure that American citizens have a feeling of ownership in the program, saying,

In 1988, he was the treasurer of the committee's contingency fund. While under his wing, the fund increased about $43 million. Later, he gave up his six figure salary position as the director of sports for the Atlanta Committee for the Olympic Games to take the unpaid presidency position.

Education and career
Walker received degrees from Benedict College (B.A.) and Columbia University (M.A.). He received his Ph.D. in biomechanics at New York University. He went back to Benedict College to begin a track and field collegiate coaching career. He received enough sports scholarships to finance his college expenses.
In 1945, he became the head coach for the North Carolina Central University track team. He also chaired the physical education and recreation departments. NCCU track and field athletes were all in the Olympic Games between the years 1956 and 1980. When Walker retired in 1986 as North Carolina's chancellor-emeritus, his team won 11 gold medals, 80 were named All-American, and 35 had national championships. 
In addition to coaching NCCU, he coached track teams from other countries. Israel and Ethiopia in 1960, Trinidad and Tobago in 1964, Jamaica in 1968, and Kenya in 1972.
The last team he led to the Olympic Games was for the United States in 1976. The team included Caitlyn Jenner (then Bruce) and Edwin Moses.

He served as the honorary chair of the Board of Directors of the Africa News Service, based in Durham North Carolina.

Personal life
He had a daughter, Dr. Carolyn Walker Hopp, and a son, LeRoy T. Walker Jr. His home was in Durham, NC. Katherine, his wife, died in 1978.

Walker was a member of Omega Psi Phi fraternity.

Awards 
In 1991 Walker was awarded the Eagle Award from the United States Sports Academy.  The Eagle Award is the Academy's highest international honor and was awarded to Walker for his significant contributions to international sport.

Walker was recognized as a Main Honoree by the Sesquicentennial Honors Commission at the Durham 150 Closing Ceremony in Durham, NC on November 2, 2019. The posthumous recognition was bestowed upon 29 individuals "whose dedication, accomplishments and passion have helped shape Durham in important ways."

Notes

References

Further reading
 Biography - An Olympic Journey: The Saga of an American Hero: LeRoy T. Walker by Charles Gaddy - Griffin Publishing Group (1998)
 Ebony. Introducing: Dr. LeRoy T. Walker, USOC president- United States Olympic Committee. LeRoy T. Walker. June 1994. [findarticles.com/p/articles/mi]
 NYTimes obit. 

1918 births
2012 deaths
Columbia University alumni
Steinhardt School of Culture, Education, and Human Development alumni
North Carolina Central University
African-American sports executives and administrators
American sports executives and administrators
Benedict Tigers men's basketball players
Benedict Tigers football players
College men's track and field athletes in the United States
College track and field coaches in the United States
People from Atlanta
American biologists
American men's basketball players
Presidents of the United States Olympic Committee
20th-century African-American sportspeople
21st-century African-American people